The music of Bulgaria refers to all forms of music associated with the country of Bulgaria, including classical, folk, popular music, and other forms.

Classical music, opera, and ballet are represented by composers Emanuil Manolov, Pancho Vladigerov and Georgi Atanasov and singers Ghena Dimitrova, Mariana Paunova, Boris Hristov, Raina Kabaivanska and Nicolai Ghiaurov. Notable names from the contemporary pop scene are Lili Ivanova, Emil Dimitrov and Vasil Naydenov. Prominent Bulgarian artists living abroad include Sylvie Vartan, Kristian Kostov, Philipp Kirkorov, Lucy Diakovska, Mira Aroyo, Mikhael Paskalev, Nora Nova, Vasko Vassilev and Ivo Papazov.  

The Bulgarian State Television Female Vocal Choir has received a Grammy Award in 1990. The Philip Kutev Ensemble, the first of the Bulgarian state-sponsored folk ensembles and founded in 1951, also is featured on the 1990 Grammy-winning album and has had many well-known Bulgarian folk singers, including, at present, Neli Andreeva and Sorina Bogomilova. Rhodope folk singer Valya Balkanska has recorded the folk song "Izlel ye Delyo Haydutin", which was included on the Golden Disk sent into space with the Voyager spacecraft in 1977.

Instruments

Bulgarian music uses a wide range of instruments. Some folk instruments are variants of traditional Asian instruments such as the "Saz" (Bulgarian tambura), or the kemençe (Bulgarian gadulka). More modern style instruments are often used in the modern dance music that is an offshoot of traditional village music.

Bulgarian folk bands, called bitovi, use instruments that commonly include
The Daire was a tambourine of varna folk music of eastern balkans of Bulgarian traditional musical instruments of rhopode regions closed was a Sleigh Bells or Tambourine and big Daire

The Accordion is closed-keyboard instrument of rhopode region and strandja regions of Bulgaria keyboard instruments was bayan and the concertina

The gaida, a traditional goat-skin bagpipe.  There are two common types of gaida. The Thracian gaida is tuned either in D or in A. The Rhodopean gaida, called the kaba gaida, is larger, has a much deeper sound and is tuned in F.
The kaval, an end-blown flute is very close to the Turkish kaval, as well as the Arabic "Ney." 
The Guitar was is big guitar of rila guitar of Bulgarian wooden guitar makes of wood the strings are woodless is from goat skin was the Ukulele and the Bass guitar and the Balalaika of rila mountains regions of Rhopode and rila regions
The gadulka, a bowed stringed instrument perhaps descended from the rebec, held vertically, with melody and sympathetic strings. The bass gadulka has largely been replaced by the double bass (called in Bulgarian a contrabas).
The tǔpan, a large drum worn over the shoulder by the player and hit with a beater ("kiyak") on one side and a thin stick ("osier") on the other.
The tambura, a long-necked, metal-strung, fretted lute used for rhythmic accompaniment as well as melodic solos. It is somewhat like the Greek bouzouki and very similar to the Tamburica family's "alto" instrument, the brac.
The tarambuka or dumbek, an hourglass-shaped finger-drum. It is very similar to the Macedonia and Serbia "darambuka" and the Bulgaria"Tarambuka" (Тарамбука).

Modern professional musicians soon reached new heights of innovation in using traditional Bulgarian instruments, by expanding the capacities of the gaida (Kostadin Varimezov and Nikola Atanasov Plamen Deyanski), gadulka (Mihail Marinov, Atanas Vulchev) and kaval (Stoyan Chobanov, Nikola Ganchev, Stoyan Velichkov, Nedyalko Nedyalkov, Theodosii Spassov). Other instruments arrived in Bulgaria in the 19th century, including the accordion and the clarinet. Bulgarian accordion music was defined by Boris Karlov and later Roma musicians including Kosta Kolev and Ibro Lolov.

In 1965, the Ministry of Culture founded the Koprivshtitsa National Music Festival, which has become an important event in showcasing Bulgarian music, singing and dance. It is held once every five years, and the last festival was 7–9 August 2015.

Instruments used in wedding music include violin, accordion, gaida, kaval, tapan, Tambura, guitar and  Piano.

Folk

Regional styles abound in Bulgaria. Northern Bulgaria, Dobruja, Shopluk, Thrace, Strandzha, Macedonia and Rhodopes - all have distinctive sounds.

Some folk music revolves around holidays like Christmas, New Year's Day, midsummer, and the Feast of St. Lazarus, as well as the Strandzha region's unusual Nestinarstvo rites, in which villagers fall into a trance and dance on hot coals as part of the joint feast of Sts Konstantin and Elena on 21 May. Music is also a part of more personal celebrations such as weddings.

Singing has always been a tradition for both men and women. Songs were often sung by women at work parties such as the sedenka (often attended by young men and women in search of partners to court), betrothal ceremonies, and just for fun. Women also had an extensive repertoire of songs that they sang while working in the fields.

Young women eligible for marriage played a particularly important role at the dancing in the village square (which not too long ago was the major form of "entertainment" in the village and was a very important social scene). The dancing — every Sunday and for three days on major holidays like Easter — began not with instrumental music, but with two groups of young women singing, one leading each end of the dance line. Later on, instrumentalists might arrive and the singers would no longer lead the dance. A special form of song, the lament, was sung not only at funerals but also when young men departed for military service.

Bulgarian folk music is known for its asymmetrical rhythms (defined by the famous Hungarian composer and ethnomusicologist Béla Bartók as "Bulgarian rhythms"), where meter is split into uneven combinations of short (two metric units) and long (three metric units) beats, corresponding to the dancers' short and long steps. In European folk music, such asymmetrical rhythms are commonly used in Bulgaria, Greece, elsewhere in the Balkans, and less commonly in Norway and Sweden.

The most important state-supported folk ensemble of the socialist era was the Sofia-based State Ensemble for Folk Songs and Dances, founded in 1951 and led by Philip Koutev. Koutev became perhaps the most influential musician of 20th century Bulgaria, and arranged rural music with harmonies more "accessible" to audiences in other countries, to great domestic acclaim. The ensemble has now been renamed the Philip Kutev Ensemble in his honor. In 1952, Georgi Boyadzhiev founded the group known today as the Bulgarian State Television Female Vocal Choir, which became famous worldwide after the release of a series of recordings entitled Le Mystère des Voix Bulgares.

The distinctive sounds of women's choirs in Bulgarian folk music come from their unique rhythms, harmony and vocal production. Characteristic polyphony, such as the use of close intervals like the major second and the singing of a drone accompaniment underneath the melody, are especially common in songs from the Shope region around the Bulgarian capital Sofia and the Pirin region (Bulgarian Macedonia). In addition to the ensemble led by Koutev, who adapted and arranged many of the harmonies, and composed several songs (as did his wife, Maria Kouteva) that were also performed by other groups, other women's vocal groups gained popularity, including Trio Bulgarka, consisting of Yanka Rupkina, Eva Georgieva, and Stoyanka Boneva. Some of these groups were included in the "Mystery of the Bulgarian Voices" tours.

Trio Bulgarka were featured on The Sensual World album by Kate Bush on the songs "Deeper Understanding", "Never Be Mine", and "Rocket's Tail". In 1993 they appeared on another Kate Bush album, The Red Shoes, in the songs "You're the One", "The Song of Solomon", and "Why Should I Love You?", which also featured Prince.

Asymmetric meters

One of the most distinctive features of Bulgarian folk music is the complexity of its rhythms in comparison to Western music. These can be understood as combinations of groups of "quick" and "slow" beats. For example, the dance lesnoto ("the light/easy one") has a meter of seven beats with emphasis on the first, fourth, and sixth. This can be divided into three groups, a "slow" unit of three beats and two "quick" units of two beats, often written 3+2+2.

Each basic folk dance type uses a distinct combination of these rhythmic "units".

Some rhythms with the same number of beats can be divided in different ways. Eight-beat rhythms can be divided 2+3+3, 3+2+3, 3+3+2, 2+2+2+2, 2+2+4, 2+4+2, 4+2+2 or 4+4.

Select discography
Music of Bulgaria – Original 1955 Recording (Nonesuch 9 72011). Early recordings of Philip Koutev and the Ensemble of the Bulgarian Republic. This was one of Frank Zappa's favorite albums, and Bulgarian harmonies reportedly influenced the harmonies of Crosby, Stills, Nash & Young.
Le Mystère des Voix Bulgares – (Nonesuch 9 79165 in the U.S.; 4AD Records CAD603CD in the UK). Featuring the Bulgarian State Radio and Television Female Choir. This is the world hit that introduced many to Bulgarian music. It is actually a collection of recordings by various artists and groups. A group that included some of these singers (and others) toured under this name.
Village Music of Bulgaria – (Elektra/Nonesuch 9 79195). Two albums of field recordings by Martin Koenig on one CD (A Harvest, a Shepherd, a Bride, and In the Shadow of the Mountain). One of the tracks, a recording of "Izlel je Delyo Hajdutin", was included by Carl Sagan and Ann Druyan on the Voyager Golden Record.
A song from the Rhodope Mountains, "Izlel ye Delyo Haydutin" by Valya Balkanska – Part of the Voyager Golden Record selection of music, included in the two Voyager spacecraft launched in 1977.*Balkana The Music of Bulgaria – (Hannibal HNCD 1335). Many of the songs are by Trio Bulgarka or one of its members.
The Forest is Crying (Lament for Indje Voivoda) – (Hannibal HNCD 1342). By the Trio Bulgarka.
Two Girls Started to Sing ... Bulgarian Village Singing – (Rounder CD 1055). Field recordings.
Bulgarian Soul – Bulgarian operatic mezzo Vesselina Kasarova sings Bulgarian folk songs with the Cosmic Voices from Bulgaria. Songs are arranged by the Bulgarian composer Krassimir Kyurkchiyski and accompanied by the Sofia Soloists Chamber Orchestra.

Select artists and groups
 
 Bulgarian State Television Female Vocal Choir (Le Mystère des Voix Bulgares)
 Cosmic voices from Bulgaria
 Trio Bulgarka, Yanka Rupkina
 Valkana Stoyanova
 Valya Balkanska
 Stefka Sabotinova
 Nikolina Chakardakova
 Neli Andreeva

 Nedialka Keranova
 Diko Iliev – compose Danube horo and other
 Filip Kutev
 Iliya Argirov
 Bulgare ensemble
 Daniel Spassov
 Svetoglas
 Neshka Robeva's spectacles
 Kostadin Gugov
 London Bulgarian Choir
 Kitka – based in Berkeley, California
 Nadka Karadjova
 Vulkana Stoyanova
 The Grannies From Bistritsa
 Oratnitza – contemporary band with folk influences
 Outhentic – contemporary ethno-jazz band
 Iliya Lukov
 Elitsa & Stoyan – contemporary electronic/folk duo
 Filip Kutev ensemble

Orthodox
The tradition of church singing in Bulgaria is more than a thousand years old, and can be traced back to the early Middle Ages. One of the earliest known musical figures (composer, singer and musical reformer) of Medieval Europe John Kukuzel (1280–1360), known as The Angel-voiced for his singing abilities, has Bulgarian origins.

In the Bulgarian Orthodox Church, there are two traditions of church singing:

 Eastern monodic (one-voice) singing and choral (Polyphonic). The Eastern monodic singing observes the tradition of Greek and Byzantine music and the requirements of the eight-tones canon of the Eastern Orthodox chanting.
 The second tradition is rooted in choral church music, established during the 19th century, when Russian choral church music began to have an influence in Bulgaria. During the 19th and 20th century, many Bulgarian composers created their works in the spirit of Russian polyphony. Today, Orthodox music is alive and is performed both during church worship services and at concerts by secular choirs and soloists.

The following list shows contemporary Bulgarian choirs and singers that have a repertoire rooted in orthodox music:

 
 St. Alexandar Nevsky Cathedral Choir
 "Madrigal" Chamber Choir
 Sofia Boys' Choir
 Sofia Orthodox Choir
 Svetoglas
 Sofia Priest Choir
 Yoan Kukuzel Choir
 Opera singer Boris Hristov
 Opera singer Nikola Ghuzelev

Classical
 
 Alexandra Fol
 Alexandrina Pendachanska
 Mihail Angelov
 Liudmil Angelov
 Anatoli Krastev
 Anna Tomowa-Sintow
 Anna-Maria Ravnopolska-Dean
 Ari Leschnikoff – actual name Asparuh Leschnikoff
 Boris Christoff
 Dobri Hristov
 Dobrin Petkov
 Dobrinka Tabakova
 Emil Tabakov
 Emil Tchakarov
 Georgi Tutev
 Ghena Dimitrova
 Gheorghi Arnaoudov
 Hristo Tsanoff
 Konstantin Iliev
 Mariana Paunova
 Milen Nachev
 Nayden Todorov
 Neva Krysteva
 Nicola Ghiuzelev
 Nicolai Ghiaurov
 Pancho Vladigerov
 Petko Dimitrov
 Raina Kabaivanska
 Ralitsa Tcholakova
 Rossen Milanov
 Svetla Protich
 Veneta Vicheva
 Vesselina Kasarova
 New Symphony Orchestra

Popular
Some of the most popular artists include:
 
 Lili Ivanova
 Emil Dimitrov
 Vasil Naydenov
 Bogdana Karadocheva
 Pasha Hristova
 Mariya Neikova
 Lea Dimitrova
 Desi Dobreva
 Yordanka Hristova
 Margarita Hranova
 Riton Duet
 Todor Kolev
 Tonika
 Rositsa Kirilova
 Silvia Katsarova
 Stenli
 Veselin Marinov
 Diana Ekspress
 Grafa
 Karizma
 Miro
 Maria Ilieva
 Irina Florin
 Mariana Popova
 Mihaela Fileva
 Poli Genova
 Ruth Koleva
 Svetla Ivanova
 Mary Boys Band
 Rushi Vidinliev
 Shturcite
 FSB (band)
 Bo Bo Bo (band), Boris Godjunov, Borislav Grancharov and Boyan Ivanov, pop vocal trio
 Ice Cream (band)
 Stefan Valdobrev

Chalga

Chalga (pop-folk) is a contemporary music style that combines often provocative Bulgarian lyrics with popular Eastern European (rarely Russian and Ukrainian) and Turkish music. It is the Bulgarian version of the corresponding variations in neighbouring countries such as Greece (Laïkó), Serbia (Turbofolk) or Romania (manele).

This subgenre is rather a mixture of synthpop, chalga and gypsy music with Bulgarian wedding motives. Yuri Yunakov, a Bulgarian Romani saxophonist, is one of its creators with clarinetist Ivo Papazov. The album New Colors in Bulgarian Wedding Music highlights his amalgamation of traditional Bulgarian music with more modern elements.

During the Communist era, some folk musicians lived outside the state-supported music scene.  Without official support, wedding bands were also without official limitations on their music, leading to fusions with foreign styles and instruments. Thrace was an important center of this music, which was entirely underground until 1986, when a festival of this music, which became a biennial event, was inaugurated in the town of Stambolovo, and artists like Sever, Trakiîski Solisti, Shoumen and Juzhni Vetar became popular, especially clarinetist Ivo Papasov.

Select artists

 
 Azis
 Anelia
 Gloria
 Galena
 Desi Slava
 Emilia
 Ivana
 Kamelia
 Preslava
 Gergana
 Slavi Trifonov and Ku-Ku Band
 Sofi Marinova

Jazz
 
 Ruth Koleva
 Theodosii Spassov
 Ivo Papazov
 Camellia Todorova
 Jivko Petrov
 Yildiz Ibrahimova
 Hilda Kazasyan
 Vasil Petrov
 Simeon Venkov – Moni
 Miroslav Ivanov
 Veselin Veselinov – Eko
 Michail Yossifov
 Milcho Leviev
 Rossen Zahariev
 Anatoly Vapirov
 Hristo Yotzov
 Antoni Rikev
 Nikolay Danev
 Tri O FIve

Electronic

 Deep Zone Project
 Esem
 Shamanez
 Mira Aroyo (of Ladytron)
 Valdi Sabev
 Apo & Nevena
 Gravity Co
 Ivan Shopov
 Stephan Panev
 Michail Goleminov
 Bulgaro
 Tibetan hearts
 KiNK

Rap
 
 Misho Shamara
 Spens
 Upsurt
 100 Kila
 Krisko
Homelesz
 Keranov
 Manata
 Jluch
 Qvkata DLG
 Grigovor
 Logo5
 Mr. Freesk
 F.O.
 Jay
 Soni Bonanza
 Wosh MC
 Sekta
 Skandau

Rock, metal and new wave
 
 Ahat
 Akaga
 Georgi Minchev
 Signal
 FSB (Formatsia Studio Balkanton)
 Shturcite
 Hipodil
 Milena Slavova
 Balkandji
 Bandaracite
 Barabi Blues Band
 B.F.H.
 BTR
 D-2
 Epizod
 Grimaze
 Monolith
 Nova Generacia
 Obraten Efekt
 Ostava
 Analgin
 Kontrol
 Kukeri
 Poduene Blues Band
 Srebyrnite grivni
 Tangra
 Wickeda
 Impulse
 Faktor
 Odd Crew
 Review

Punk and funk
 
 Novi Tsvetya ("New Flowers") 
 D.D.T.
 Sub Zero Farm
 Viperfish
 The Scroletics
 Brothers in Blood
 U.Z.Z.U.
 Akaga

Reggae

 Sen I
 Zafayah
 Jahmmi Youth
 Roots Rocket Band
 Merudia
 Rebelites
 NRG D
 Ragga one
 Samity
 Root Souljah
 Kaya

See also
Music of Thrace
Bistritsa Babi

References

Further reading
Burton, Kim. "The Mystery Voice". 2000.  In Broughton, Simon and Ellingham, Mark with McConnachie, James and Duane, Orla (Ed.), World Music, Vol. 1: Africa, Europe and the Middle East, pp 36–45. Rough Guides Ltd, Penguin Books. 
 
Rice, Timothy (1994) May It Fill Your Soul: Experiencing Bulgarian Music
Vollan, Ståle Tvete. "Bulgarsk folkemusikk — musikktradisjon og feltarbeid". 1999. Trondheim, Norway. Master Thesis in Musicology + 1 CD, NTNU More info.

External links

 Bulgarian folk music for dances
 Bulgarian folk workshop
 

 
Balkan music